The University Theatre was for several decades one of the premier movie cinemas in Toronto, Ontario, Canada.  It was located at 100 Bloor Street West along the Mink Mile, just west of Bay Street in an area that was once home to a number of cinemas, most notably the Uptown Theatre, and was a centre for the Toronto International Film Festival. At the time of its closing it was the largest movie house in Canada.

Operating History

The University Theatre opened in 1946, and aimed to be the premier cinema in the city. It was a single screen theatre with seating for 1300 people. The cinema would host many of the most important films of its day. For major productions it would use reserved seating where patrons would buy specific seats ahead of time. The cinema also helped introduce new technologies to Toronto such as CinemaScope and 70 mm film Dolby Stereo.

Demise and Demolition

In 1985, Famous Players Realty Investments Inc. – not to be confused with their tenant Famous Players – announced plans to demolish the theatre and build a condo residential complex with a cinema. Its closing was delayed several times, with the Famous Players theatre chain trying, but not able, to sign a long-term lease.  It shuttered soon after the 1986 film festival, where it hosted the gala opening screening of The Decline of the American Empire. 

Despite the closure, it was agreed that the unique facade of the building would be preserved. When the theatre was torn down the front wall was left standing with a scaffolding at the rear supporting it. These supports were meant to be temporary but were left in place for over a decade due to the early 1990s recession.

Location Redevelopment
With the revival of the property market in the late 1990s, developments were again proposed for the site. The first plan called for a new 3100-seat  multiplex cinema to be topped with a 150-unit condominium tower. However, the cinema plans were abandoned and the building was constructed with retail along Bloor Street. The University Theatre's facade now serves as an entrance to a two-level store space, which was a  Williams-Sonoma and Pottery Barn from 2002–2015.

See also
List of cinemas in Toronto

References

External links
The University Theatre

Demolished buildings and structures in Toronto
Former cinemas in Toronto
Theatres completed in 1949
Buildings and structures demolished in 1987